South Korea (officially the Republic of Korea) competed at the 2012 Summer Olympics in London, from July 27 to August 12, 2012. This was the nation's sixteenth appearance at the Olympics, having missed the 1980 Summer Olympics in Moscow because of its support for the United States boycott. The Korean Olympic Committee sent the nation's smallest delegation to the Games since 1992. A total of 248 athletes, 135 men and 113 women, competed in 22 sports.

South Korea left London with a total of 30 medals (13 gold, 9 silver, and 8 bronze), finishing fifth in the medal standings and tying its record for the most gold medals won at an Olympics with the total it set at Beijing. Six of these medals were awarded to the team in fencing, five in shooting, four in archery, and three in judo. South Korean athletes dominated in archery, where they won gold medals in all but one sporting events and broke two world records. Despite the absence of baseball and softball at the Olympics, South Korea's team-based athletes proved successful in London, as the men's football team won the bronze medal against neighbouring Japan. For the first time in its history, South Korea won Olympic medals in team fencing.

Among the nation's medalists were pistol shooter Jin Jong-oh, and taekwondo jin Hwang Kyung-seon, who both successfully defended their Olympic titles from Beijing. Three South Korean athletes won Olympic gold medals for the first time in history: gymnast Yang Hak-seon in the men's vault exercises, archer Oh Jin-hyek in the men's individual event, and sabre fencer Kim Ji-yeon in the women's individual event. Park Tae-hwan, who won two silver medals in London, emerged as the most successful South Korean swimmer in history, with a total of four Olympic medals.

Medalists

| width="78%" align="left" valign="top" |

| width="22%" align="left" valign="top" |

Delegation 

The Korean Olympic Committee (KOC) selected a team of 245 athletes, 133 men and 112 women, to compete in 24 sports; it was the nation's smallest team sent to the Olympics since 1992. South Korea did not qualify athletes in basketball, canoeing, equestrian, and tennis. There was only a single competitor in rhythmic gymnastics, and in triathlon.

The South Korean team featured nine defending champions from Beijing, including freestyle swimmer Park Tae-hwan, the men's archery team (led by Im Dong-hyun), pistol shooter Jin Jong-oh, weightlifters Jang Mi-ran and Sa Jae-hyouk, and taekwondo jins Hwang Kyung-seon and Cha Dong-min. Among these champions, Jin Jong-oh only managed to defend his Olympic title for the second consecutive time. Handball player Yoon Kyung-shin, who competed at his fifth Olympics since 1992 (except the 1996 Summer Olympics in Atlanta, where his team did not qualify), was the oldest athlete of the team, at age 39, and later became South Korea's flag bearer at the opening ceremony. Platform diver Kim Su-ji, on the other hand, was the youngest of the team, at age 14.

Other notable South Korean athletes featured judoka and top medal contenders Wang Ki-chun and Kim Jae-bum, foil fencer and Olympic silver medalist Nam Hyun-hee, and butterfly swimmer and Youth Olympic gold medalist Chang Gyu-cheol.

The following table lists the number of South Korean competitors who participated in each Olympic sport. Note that swimming, synchronized swimming, diving and water polo are technically considered as one sport, aquatics. However, due to their significant practical differences, they are listed separately by tradition.

Archery

South Korea has qualified three archers for the men's individual event, three archers for the women's individual event, a team for the men's team event and a team for the women's team event

Men

Women

Athletics

South Korean athletes have so far achieved qualifying standards in the following athletics events (up to a maximum of 3 athletes in each event at the 'A' Standard, and 1 at the 'B' Standard):

Men
Track & road events

Field events

Women
Track & road events

Field events

Badminton

Men

Women

Mixed

Boxing

South Korea has so far qualified in the following events.

Men

Cycling

Road

Track
Sprint

Team sprint

Pursuit

Keirin

Omnium

Diving

Men

Women

Fencing

South Korea has qualified 14 fencers.
Men

Women

Field hockey

The South Korean women's hockey team have qualified a team of 16 players for the games by virtue of being runner-up at the 2010 Asian Games hockey tournament.

Men's tournament

Roster

South Korea is in Pool B of the men's tournament.

Group play

7th/8th place game

Women's tournament

Roster

South Korea is in Pool A of the women's competition.

Group play

7th/8th place

Football

Men's tournament

South Korea qualified a team of 18 players for the men's tournament. The squad won the bronze medal and the team were granted exemption to two years of mandatory military service but still required to do four weeks of basic training.

Roster

Group play

Quarter-final

Semi-final

Bronze medal game

Final rank 

Controversy
Park Jong-Woo was not present at the medal ceremony after the gold medal match between Mexico and Brazil and did not receive the bronze medal with the rest of his team due to his political position on the Liancourt Rocks, which are disputed both by South Korea and Japan by having a claim on the islands, after FIFA was notified about Park holding a sign of South Korea having claim on Dokdo, the Korean name for the islets. On 11 February 2013, Park attended an International Olympic Committee disciplinary hearing at Lausanne, Switzerland. After the Disciplinary Commission reviewed Park's action at the Olympics, the IOC decided to award the player the bronze medal he had been barred from collecting for several months.

Gymnastics

Artistic
Men
Team

Individual finals

Women

Rhythmic

Handball

South Korea has qualified for the men's and women's event by winning the Asian Olympic Qualification Tournament

Men's tournament

Group play

Women's tournament

Team roster

Group play

Quarter-final

Semi-final

Bronze medal match

Judo

Men

Women

Modern pentathlon

Based on their results at the 2011 Asian/Oceania Championships three South Korean pentathletes have qualified for London; Hwang Woo-Jin and Jung Jin-Hwa have earned places in the men's event; Yang Soo-jin has earned places in the women's event.

Rowing

South Korea has qualified the following boats.

Men

Women

Qualification Legend: FA=Final A (medal); FB=Final B (non-medal); FC=Final C (non-medal); FD=Final D (non-medal); FE=Final E (non-medal); FF=Final F (non-medal);SA/B=Semifinals A/B; SC/D=Semifinals C/D; SE/F=Semifinals E/F; QF=Quarterfinals; R=Repechage

Sailing

South Korea has qualified 1 boat for each of the following events

Men

M = Medal race; EL = Eliminated – did not advance into the medal race;

Shooting

South Korea has ensured berths in the following events of shooting:

Men

Women

Swimming

Korean swimmers have so far achieved qualifying standards in the following events (up to a maximum of 2 swimmers in each event at the Olympic Qualifying Time (OQT), and potentially 1 at the Olympic Selection Time (OST)):

Men

Women

Synchronized swimming

South Korea has qualified 2 quota places in synchronized swimming.

Table tennis 

South Korea has qualified three men and three women.

Men

Women

Taekwondo 

South Korea has ensured berths in the following events of taekwondo by reaching the top 3 of the 2011 WTF World Qualification Tournament:

Triathlon

South Korea has qualified the following athletes.

Volleyball

South Korea has qualified a women's team for the indoor tournament.

Women's tournament

Team roster

Group play

Quarter-final

Semi-final

Bronze medal match

Weightlifting

South Korea has qualified 6 men and 4 women.
Men

Women

* Sa Jae-Hyouk was forced to retire from the competition after he dislocated his elbow during his second snatch attempt.

Wrestling 

South Korea has so far qualified the following quota places.

Men's freestyle

Men's Greco-Roman

Women's freestyle

References

Summer Olympics
Nations at the 2012 Summer Olympics
2012